George Philip Hambrecht (February 1, 1871 – December 23, 1943) was a member of the Wisconsin State Assembly.

Biography
George Hambrecht was born in Milwaukee, Wisconsin on February 1, 1871. Later, he attended the University of Wisconsin-Madison, the University of Chicago and Yale Law School.

He died at his home in Madison on December 23, 1943.

Career
Hambrecht was a member of the Assembly from 1909 to 1910 and again in 1915. Additionally, he was the Grand Rapids, Wisconsin Superintendent of Schools from 1900 to 1902 and Chairman of the Wisconsin Industrial Commission from 1917 to 1921. He was a Republican.

References

External links
 

Politicians from Milwaukee
People from Wisconsin Rapids, Wisconsin
University of Wisconsin–Madison alumni
University of Chicago alumni
Yale Law School alumni
1871 births
1943 deaths
Republican Party members of the Wisconsin State Assembly